The Northumberland Senior Cup, officially named the Techflow Marine Senior Cup, is an annual football competition held between the clubs of the Northumberland Football Association which was first played in 1884. It is the senior county cup for the historic county of Northumberland, which includes Newcastle upon Tyne and North Tyneside. The final is held at St. James' Park.

The first winners were Tyne. The current holders are Newcastle United U23.

Winners

The competition was not held between 1916 and 1918 due to World War I and between 1940 and 1946 due to World War II.
The competition was cancelled in 2019-20 and 2020-21 due to the COVID-19 pandemic.

Notes 
1 Known as Newcastle United from 1892 to present
2 Known as Cramlington Town from 2001 to present
3 Merged with Newcastle East End in 1892
4 Known as Wallsend from 1912 to 1933
5 Known as North Shields Athletic from 1908 to 1918 and 1995 to 1999, Preston Colliery from 1918 to 1928, North Shields from 1928 to 1995 and 1999 to present
6 Known as Newcastle Blue Star from 1930 to 1973, 1986 to 1994, and 1997 to 2009, Blue Star Welfare from 1973 to 1979, Blue Star from 1979 to 1986, RTM Newcastle from 1994 to 1997

References

 

County Cup competitions
Football in Northumberland
Recurring events established in 1884